Tejo is a precision sport in the family of the Bocce and the petanque. Tejo can be played by men and women of all ages.

History 
The sport was born as a beach game on the coast of Argentina in the mid-nineteenth century. Over the years, it spread across Argentina and neighboring countries. It was elected in 2015 by the Ministry of Sports of the Argentine nation as an indigenous sport for the transplanted Olympics carried out in the city of Mar Del Plata and since 2018 is organized worldwide by the International Association of Tejo (AIT).

Gameplay 
Tejo is played between two opposing teams. They play by throwing a series of small discs called tejos (they have two different colours, one for each team) in a rectangular field. They try to score points, winning with 12 (traditionally 15).

One team scores a point for each of its tejos that are nearer a small and neutral tejo, which is called tejin, than the nearest tejo of the opposing team, once all the tejos are played.

The playing field covers 2.5 x 12 meters divided in two equal parts.

The traditional surface of the game is sand and can contain land up to 20%.

See also 
 Bocce
 Tejo (sport)

References

External links 

 International Tejo Association (AIT)
 Video: How do you play tejo?
 Rules of the game

Sports originating in Argentina